Klaus-Dieter Bähr (born 9 September 1941) is a German rower who represented East Germany. He competed at the 1968 Summer Olympics in Mexico City with the men's eight where they came seventh.

References

1941 births
Living people
Rowers from Berlin
German male rowers
Olympic rowers of East Germany
Rowers at the 1968 Summer Olympics
World Rowing Championships medalists for East Germany
European Rowing Championships medalists